Palisades Hudson Financial Group LLC, was founded in 1993 by Larry M. Elkin. The fee-only financial and tax-planning firm also has an affiliated Registered Investment Adviser arm, Palisades Hudson Asset Management, L.P., which began in 1997. Palisades Hudson Asset Management had more than $1.1 billion in assets under management as of April 2013. It offers services including personal financial planning, estate planning, tax planning and tax return preparation, and (through Palisades Hudson Asset Management, L.P.) investment management and asset allocation.

In 2016, Palisades Hudson moved their headquarters from Scarsdale, New York to Stamford, Connecticut and had over 20 employees located in 5 cities. Its customers are based across the United States and Brazil.

History 
In 1992, Larry M. Elkin departed Arthur Andersen in order to found a one-man financial planning firm in Hastings-on-Hudson, N.Y. The firm, which opened in January 1993, came to be known as Palisades Hudson Financial Group LLC. It eventually expanded to four offices: the New York location, which moved from Hastings-on-Hudson to Scardsale; an office in Fort Lauderdale, FL; an office in Atlanta, GA; and a Portland, OR, Location.

The firm has received notice for its estate planning work. In 2006, the firm's chief investment officer and staff successfully opposed a significant mutual fund fee increase at DWS Funds.

Recognition 
Palisades Hudson Asset Management, L.P., was one of Investment News’ top 50 registered investment advisors (RIAs) that also provide financial services in 2012.

Financial Advisor Magazine named Palisades Hudson Asset Management, L.P., one of the top RIAs in 2012 based on the firm's assets under management.

Palisades Hudson Asset Management, L.P. was one of AdvisorOne’s top 20 wealth managers for 2012.

Publications 
Palisades Hudson has produced a variety of publications, both in print and online:

 Current Commentary (blog)
 Current Commentary is a daily blog, authored by various members of the firm. It has appeared weekdays since 2009 and is republished in various online and print venues.
 Sentinel (quarterly newsletter) - Palisades Hudson has published Sentinel four times a year since 1993, covering a variety of investment and financial planning topics. It has been available online since 1995.
 First Comes Love, Then Comes Money - First published in 1994 by Doubleday Business, First Comes Love, Then Comes Money contains advice and worksheets for unmarried couples facing legal and financial challenges unique to their situation. It was written by Palisades Hudson's founder and president Larry Elkin during the period when he comprised the entirety of the firm.

References

External links 
 Company Website

Financial services companies of the United States
Financial services companies established in 1993
Companies based in Stamford, Connecticut